The Clarendon Methodist-Episcopal Church South is a historic church at 121 Third Street in Clarendon, Arkansas.  It is a two-story brick structure with a cross-gable configuration, that has a dome at the crossing point of the gables.  Single-story classroom and office wings flank the main block.  The church was built in 1912, and was designed by John Gaisford, who produced a number of designs for Episcopal Church South congregations between 1905 and 1918.  It is one of Clarendon's oldest church buildings, and one of its most impressive Classical Revival structures.

The building was listed on the National Register of Historic Places in 1984.

See also
National Register of Historic Places listings in Monroe County, Arkansas

References

Methodist churches in Arkansas
Churches on the National Register of Historic Places in Arkansas
Neoclassical architecture in Arkansas
Churches completed in 1912
Churches in Monroe County, Arkansas
1912 establishments in Arkansas
National Register of Historic Places in Monroe County, Arkansas
Neoclassical church buildings in the United States